The 1980 NCAA Division I Golf Championship was the 42nd annual NCAA-sanctioned golf tournament to determine the individual and team national champions of men's collegiate golf at the Division I level in the United States.

The tournament was held at the Ohio State University Golf Club in Columbus, Ohio.

Oklahoma State won the team championship, the Cowboys' third NCAA title and first since 1981.

Jay Don Blake, from Utah State, won the individual title.

Individual results

Individual champion
 Jay Don Blake, Utah State

See also
 NAIA Men's Golf Championship

References

NCAA Men's Golf Championship
Golf in Ohio
NCAA Golf Championship
NCAA Golf Championship
NCAA Golf Championship